Walter Lee Howard (born February 18, 1965) is a gridiron football coach and former linebacker. He was most recently the defensive line coach for the Montreal Alouettes of the Canadian Football League (CFL). He was drafted by the Kansas City Chiefs in the third round of the 1987 NFL Draft.

Playing career 
Howard was an all-conference linebacker at Texas A&M before being drafted by the Kansas City Chiefs in the third round of the 1987 NFL Draft. Howard spent two seasons with the Chiefs and a season with the Barcelona Dragons of the World League of American Football before going into coaching.

Coaching career 
Howard began his coaching career at his alma mater Texas A&M, where he was a member of a coaching staff that won three consecutive Southwest Conference championships. He went on to coach at Grinnell College in Iowa, working his way up to defensive coordinator in 1996. Howard left Grinnell to join the coaching staff of the St. Louis Rams as a defensive assistant in 1998. He won his first career Super Bowl with the team when they won Super Bowl XXXIV over the Tennessee Titans in 1999.

After a stint at Louisiana Tech as their linebackers coach, Howard joined the coaching staff at Southwest Texas State as their associate head coach and co-defensive coordinator before leaving to join Jack Del Rio's inaugural coaching staff of the Jacksonville Jaguars in 2003.

Howard joined the coaching staff at UCLA in 2006 as their defensive line coach, eventually being promoted to associate head coach of the defense. After one season at Washington State, Howard spent 2012 at California as their defensive line coach.

Howard joined the Saskatchewan Roughriders in 2013 as their defensive line coach. He won his first career Grey Cup with the team when they defeated the Hamilton Tiger-Cats in the 101st Grey Cup. He was named the defensive line coach of the Winnipeg Blue Bombers in 2015, spending three seasons with the team.

Howard was named the linebackers coach of the Montreal Alouettes in 2018. He was reassigned to defensive line for the 2019 season. He was relieved of his coaching duties on September 26, 2021.

References

External links 
 Montreal Alouettes bio

1965 births
Living people
People from Bryan, Texas
Players of American football from Texas
Coaches of American football from Texas
American football linebackers
Texas A&M Aggies football players
Kansas City Chiefs players
Barcelona Dragons players
Texas A&M Aggies football coaches
Grinnell Pioneers football coaches
St. Louis Rams coaches
Louisiana Tech Bulldogs football coaches
Jacksonville Jaguars coaches
UCLA Bruins football coaches
Washington State Cougars football coaches
California Golden Bears football coaches
Saskatchewan Roughriders coaches
Winnipeg Blue Bombers coaches
Montreal Alouettes coaches